The Plaza Mayor (English: Town square) is a major public space in the heart of Madrid, the capital of Spain. It was once the centre of Old Madrid. It was first built (1580–1619) during the reign of Philip III. Only a few blocks away is another famous plaza, the Puerta del Sol.

History and architecture 

The Plaza Mayor dates back to the 15th century where it was originally called the "Plaza del Arrabal" and was used as the main market of the town. In 1561, the plaza was transferred to the city of Madrid. King Philip II commissioned Classical architect Juan de Herrera to remodel the area. Construction did not begin until Philip III's reign in 1617. Juan Gómez de Mora continued on the architectural renovation, and was finished two years later in 1619. The Plaza Mayor has suffered 3 major fires in its history. The first was in 1631. Juan Gómez de Mora took on the reconstructions of the plaza following this fire. The second of the fires occurred in 1670, with the architect Tomás Román in charge of the reconstruction. The last fire consumed a third of the square and took place in 1790. Today, the Plaza Mayor's architecture is credited to Juan de Villanueva. He handled the reconstruction following the massive fire in 1790. Prior to this, the buildings that enclosed the square were five stories. Juan de Villanueva lowered the square's surrounding buildings to three stories, closed the corners and created large entrances into the squares. Construction after Juan de Villanueva's death by Antonio López Aguado and Custodio Moreno and was finished in 1854.

Today, the Plaza Mayor is rectangular in shape and highlights the uniformity of the architecture. The Plaza measures 129 m x 94 m (423 ft x 308 ft). 237 balconies are present on the three-story residential buildings that face inward towards the Plaza. To enter or exit The Plaza Mayor, there are ten entrances to choose from, however, there are nine gates. The entrances are named: 7 de Julio, Arco de Triunfo and Felipe III to the North; Sal, Zaragoza and Gerona to the East; Botoneras, Toledo and Cuchilleros to the South; Ciudad Rodrigo to the West. In the center of the square stands the statue of Philip III on a horse, which was placed in 1848. The Plaza Mayor has been the scene of multitudinous events. It has hosted executions in history. Today, it is the location of the annual Christmas market. It has also hosted bullfights and soccer games. Every Sunday and holidays it hosts stamp collecting and coin collecting market in the mornings.

In 1880, the Casa de la Panadería was restored by Joaquín María de la Vega. The Casa de la Panadería is the piece of the façade framed by two two-angled towers. It has been used for many different purposes in history. Its name originates from its original use of the main city bakery.

In 1921 the farmhouse was reformed, and then again in 1935 by Fernando García de Mercadal. In 1960s, the plaza closed itself to road traffic and added underground parking below the plaza. The last of the performances in the Plaza Mayor, held in 1992, consisted of mural decoration, the work of Carlos Franco, of the Casa de la Panadería, which represents mythological figures such as the goddess Cibeles. Today, the Plaza Mayor is a major tourist spot, but is also celebrated by the citizens of Madrid and has become a piece of Spanish culture. Next to the Plaza Mayor at Arco de Cuchilleros Street is the Restaurante Botin, the oldest restaurant of the world.

Name

The name of the plaza has changed over time. It has been known as "Plaza del Arrabal", "Plaza de la Constitución", "Plaza Real", "Plaza de la República" and now "Plaza Mayor". These names reflect events, history and reign in Spanish history.

"Plaza del Arrabal" was the original name of the present day "Plaza Mayor". The "Plaza del Arrabal" was once the site of the most popular marketplace until the end of 15th century. Following the Constitution of 1812, all major plazas in Spain were renamed "Plaza de la Constitución". It also held this name 1820 to 1823, 1833 to 1835, 1840 to 1843, and 1876 to 1922. When the Borbón king was restored in 1814, it became known as the "Plaza Real". In 1873, the name changed to "Plaza de la República". At the end of the Spanish Civil War the plaza received its present name of "Plaza Mayor".

Statue
There is a bronze statue of King Philip III at the center of the square, created in 1616 by Jean Boulogne and Pietro Tacca. Giambologna's equestrian statue of Philip III dates to 1616, but it was not placed in the center of the square until 1848. The statue was a gift from the Duke of Florence at that time. It was Queen Isabel II ordered to move it from Casa de Campo to become the centerpiece of the Plaza Mayor.

Photos

References

External links
 Plaza Mayor, description and pictures
Plaza Mayor Information and photos.
Plaza Mayor in English Visitor and student information, history, present day uses and photos.

Mayor
Bien de Interés Cultural landmarks in Madrid
Plazas in Spain
Renaissance architecture in Madrid
Baroque architecture in Madrid
Sol neighborhood, Madrid